The Superdeep is a 2020 Russian horror film directed by Arseny Syuhin, based on the real-life Kola Superdeep Borehole.

The film focuses on a group of researchers and soldiers who investigate the mystery surrounding reports of a disease outbreak at a secret underground research facility in 1984 Russia.

Plot 
Set in 1984, Anna Fedorova, a Russian epidemiologist, tries to resign after her research associate Dr. Zotoff volunteered to test a vaccine on himself without preliminary or animal testing which resulted in his death.

Later, Anna is celebrating New Year's eve with the family and friends and is congratulated on her being able to quickly develop a vaccine. She receives a call from the colonel telling her that they will leave shortly for the Kola bore hole. Sounds of an unknown origin were recorded deep beneath the surface and shortly after 20 people went missing. The bore hole is not only as the public believes it, but also a deep underground research lab. Anna is tasked with retrieving samples.

Anna, the Colonel and a squad of soldiers led by Major Sergei Makeev are flown by helicopter to the ice covered facility in Murmansk. Upon landing, their helicopter is approached by a man in a lab coat who refuses to obey instructions. He is shot several times but continues towards the helicopter. He detonates a hand grenade, killing himself and causing minor damage to the helicopter and its passengers.

Anna is told by a man named Zimin that they are being lied to. He states that it isn't a disease and that the lower levels of the facility are Hell. Anna, the Colonel, and the squad are met by the Deputy Head of Research of the facility Peter Kuznetsov and the man who reported Dr. Grigoriev′s secrecy surrounding the disease. Dr. Grigoriev wants guarantees that the remaining employees sealed in the lower levels of the facility during the evacuation be rescued. He demonstrates that the pass codes have been changed and he is the only one that knows them.

During the descent the elevators brakes don't respond and Dr. Grigoriev depressurizes the elevator and puts on an oxygen mask. The group passes out while Dr. Grigoriev escapes into the facility with the elevator key.

When the group wakes up, they find an engineer named Nikolay and a doctor named Kira in the cafeteria who were left behind during the initial evacuation. There is still no sign of Dr. Grigoriev. Anna performs tests on Kira and Nikolay in the med lab and they show no signs of infection. Anna encounters Dr. Grigoriev who begs her to evacuate the others up the shaft and that he can't give her the elevator key. Anna yells for the others and Dr. Grigoriev is wounded and flees using the elevator. A group of soldiers lead by Egorov put on temperature protective suits and are about to descend through the shaft when the doors are opened from within the shaft. A lone lab assistant named Olga is found without any protective gear and is taken back to the med lab for observation and tests while Egorov and his team descend the shaft.

Olga show signs of fever but declares that she is very cold. Her back is covered with mold-like growths which Anna takes a sample of. Dr. Grigoriev announces over the intercom that since they didn't evacuate to the surface through the shaft, that he has no choice but to seal them all within the facility. Dr. Grigoriev causes an explosion that damages the facilities pressure pump and will cause the facility to collapse within an hour. Upon returning to the med lab, Anna and the Major find the walls covered with mold with Olga half melted to the floor but still alive. Olga releases a cloud of spores and Anna is able to get to a gas mask but is soon attacked by Kira having been heavily infected and mutating in the same way as Olga. Anna discovers that the mold dies when exposed to cold and uses a fire extinguisher to leave the med lab and decontaminate herself while the Major is already showing signs of infection.

Anna discusses the situation with the Colonel and explains that the mold can't survive in cold conditions and that the permafrost surrounding the facility is what is keeping it from spreading. The only way the mold can live is within a warm bodied host but if the host dies in a cold environment then the mold dies as well.

As the group prepares to ascend through the shaft while wearing protective suits with the infected Major, they receive a radio broadcast from Egorov saying that they are under attack and not to open the door to the lower level shaft, even if it's them. Gunfire is heard shortly after and only two of the soldiers return saying they encountered something big, their weapons had no effect, and it now knows where they are. The third soldier returns missing an arm and slits his own throat before the door to the shaft closes. The soldiers, including the Major stay behind to fight whatever is chasing them while the rest descend in the elevator.

Anna, Nikolay, Peter, and the Colonel successfully make it to the lower level. The group finds a wall of infected melted together, killed by the cold. The Colonel decides to go into the 200 degree environment to try and retrieve the elevator key that Dr. Grigoriev took with him. The protective suits have all been sabotaged by Dr. Grigoriev so the Colonel must go without protection. Anna, Peter, and Nikolay agree that even if they make it back, they must not tell anyone about the mold since someone will eventually try to research it and could endanger all life on earth.

The Colonel does not return so Anna goes out into the 200 degree environment where the organism lives in order to retrieve the elevator key. She finds the Colonel dead with the key. Upon returning, Peter forces the other two by gunpoint to give him the key so he can return to the surface and become famous for discovering the mold. Peter is attacked by a large creature made up of screaming infected hosts that have all been melted into one organism. Anna hides in the cafeterias freezer, before taking the elevator key from Peter who has been absorbed. Anna finds Nikolay and together they barely escape the creature by getting on the elevator to the surface. They use the elevator key to begin their ascent but discover the Major melted into the floor. The Major begs that he not be allowed to the surface since it would cause the death of all life on the planet. Nikolay insists on escaping the facility no matter the cost and violently fights Anna over the elevators controls. The Major saves Anna by stabbing Nikolay through the neck, killing him. Anna now infected is dragged off by a hazmat team but not before being able to plummet the elevator. While being taken to the surface, Anna steals a grenade from one of the hazmat soldiers and forces them to let her go. Now outside in the cold and surrounded by soldiers, Anna pulls the pin on the grenade in order to kill the mold within her and keep its existence a secret.

Cast 

Other members of Mikheev's unit include Ilya Ilinykh as an unnamed Sergeant, Vladimir Kolida as a radio operator, and Evgeniy Tscherkashin as a sniper.

References

External links 
 

2020 films
2020s Russian-language films
Russian science fiction horror films
2020 science fiction horror films
Films set in 1984